The Nad Al Sheba Trophy, is a horse race run over a distance of 2,810 metres (one and three quarter miles) on turf in late February or early March at Meydan Racecourse in Dubai. The race is named after Nad Al Sheba Racecourse which was the principal racing venue in Dubai before it was replaced by Maeydan.

The Nad Al Sheba Trophy was first contested in 2011 as a Listed race and was elevated to Group 3 level a year later.

Records
Record time:
2:53.78 - Manobo 2022

Most successful horse (2 wins):
 no horse has won the race more than once

Most wins by a jockey:
 4 - William Buick 2018, 2020, 2022, 2023

Most wins by a trainer:
 5 - Charlie Appleby 2018, 2019, 2020, 2022, 2023

Most wins by an owner:
 10 - Godolphin 2011, 2013, 2014, 2017, 2018, 2019, 2020, 2021, 2022, 2023

Winners

See also
 List of United Arab Emirates horse races

References

Horse races in the United Arab Emirates
Recurring sporting events established in 2011
2011 establishments in the United Arab Emirates